Jingzhou Confucius Temple, or Jingzhou Confucian Temple, previously Confucian Temple of Jiangling County (江陵县文庙), is a Confucian temple located in Jingzhou Experimental Middle School (荆州市实验中学), Jingzhong Road, Jingzhou District, Jingzhou City, Hubei Province.

Completed in 1725, Jingzhou Confucius Temple was severely damaged by the invading Japanese army during the Second Sino-Japanese War, and then underwent restorations. It is the only existing Confucian temple in Jingzhou.

History
The construction of Jingzhou Confucius Temple began in the 60th year of the Kangxi in the Qing Dynasty (1721),  and was completed in 1725.

During the Second Sino-Japanese War, when the Japanese invasion army occupied Jingzhou, the Jingzhou Confucius Temple was destroyed and the relics inside the temple were looted by the Japanese army. Now, only the Dacheng Hall (大成殿) and the Lattice Star Gate (棂星门) remain.

Conservations
After the founding of the People's Republic of China, the Jingzhou local government repaired the Jingzhou Confucius Temple twice in 1953 and 1965. 

In 1960, the original Jiangling County Government listed Jingzhou Confucius Temple as a key cultural relic protection unit, and in 2008 it was designated as a provincial cultural relic protection unit in Hubei Province.

References

Confucian temples
Confucian temples in China
18th-century establishments in China
18th-century Confucian temples
Religious buildings and structures in China
Traditional Chinese architecture